"You Wanted More" is a song by Los Angeles band Tonic that originally appeared in the 1999 film American Pie. It was released on June 7, 1999, and was also featured on Tonic's second album, Sugar, released later in the year. The single peaked at number three on the US Billboard Bubbling Under Hot 100 chart and reached the same position on the Billboard Mainstream Rock Tracks chart, as well as on the Canadian RPM Rock Report.

Lyrics
The lyrics include many lines beginning with "Love is": "Love is tragic", "love is strong", "love is surely better when it's gone", etc. The chorus expresses that the singer's love interest was too demanding: "'Cause you wanted more/More than I could give/More than I could handle/In a life that I can't live".

Critical reception
All-Reviews.com commented on the contrast between instrumentation and lyrics: "The music has tough rock guitar chords but the lyrics are a sappy account of what love is", and opined that Tonic's "desire to be all things to all people is illustrated by the song's opening".

Chart performance
The single peaked at number three on the US Billboard Bubbling Under Hot 100, leading some to brand Tonic a one-hit wonder, with "If You Could Only See" being the band's only song to gain extended success. Despite this, the song is well known in the United States due to its use in American Pie. "You Wanted More" also peaked at number three on Billboards Mainstream Rock Tracks chart and number 10 on Billboards Modern Rock Tracks chart. Its airplay peak was in October 1999, as it was the sixth-most played song on alternative, pop and rock radio stations across the United States.

In Canada, "You Wanted More" peaked at number three on the RPM Rock Report and was the 16th most successful rock hit of 1999. The song also experienced moderate success in Australia, where it peaked at number 58 alongside another Tonic song, "Sugar".

Music video
The music video, directed by Niels Alpert, is set at a high school. Emerson Hart is shown both as a janitor in the hallway and playing with his band in the gymnasium. Scenes with cheerleaders wearing uniforms with the word LOVE in the gym are interspersed throughout the video. The principal's office and biology class are also shown, while students walk out of the building and make out on the quad at the end of the video.

Track listings
European CD single

German maxi-CD single

Charts

Weekly charts

Year-end charts

Release history

References

1999 singles
1999 songs
Tonic (band) songs
Universal Records singles